Lorena Ziraldo (born in Italy) is a Canadian artist based in Ottawa, Ontario. She works mainly in oil and employs bold colors in a loose, gestural style.

Education
She studied Art History at the University of Toronto and Fine Arts under Gerald Ferguson at NSCAD University, obtaining her BFA in 2000.

Work
Her paintings have been exhibited in Canada and the USA. Ziraldo's 2014 solo exhibition "National Portrait Gallery" at Wallack's Galleries called for the creation of a portrait gallery in the nation's capital.

Awards 

 Walker Industries Art Competition, 2019, 2nd Prize
 Figureworks Award Show, 2011, 1st Prize

Exhibition catalogues 
"Beauty In The Time Of ...", 2022, Orange Art Gallery, Ottawa
"Seventeen Years, 17 Paintings", 2018, Secord Gallery, Halifax
"Couleur, beauté et quadrillage", 2017, Galerie d’art Blanche, Montreal
"National Portrait Gallery", 2014, Wallack’s Galleries, Ottawa
"Snapshot", 2013, Secord Gallery, Halifax

References

External links
Lorena Ziraldo at Academia
Portrait of Queen Elizabeth II at Wikimedia

Canadian women artists
Italian emigrants to Canada
People of Friulian descent
Living people
NSCAD University alumni
Year of birth missing (living people)